The Renous River is a tributary of the Southwest Miramichi River in New Brunswick, Canada.

The Renous River has its origins south of Holmes Lake in the Miramichi Highlands, part of the Appalachian Mountains, in the northwest corner of Northumberland County.

Renous River system consists of the two major branches, the North and the South, which merge and flow through heavy forests to join the Southwest Miramichi River at the village of Quarryville in Renous.

The river is noted for Atlantic salmon fishing. The annual run of Atlantic salmon occurs from June through October each summer and early autumn.  Fishing is restricted to fly fishing only and all large salmon must be released.  Salmon fishing in this river is generally best after a spate.  Popular salmon flies on the Renous River include the Black Bear series, Butterfly, and Silver Cosseboom.  Small deer-hair Buck Bugs are a popular fly in normal water conditions.  There is also a local fly pattern known as the Renous Special.

Tributaries
 North Renous River
 South Renous River
 Little South Renous River
 Dungarvon River

See also
List of rivers of New Brunswick

Rivers of New Brunswick
Landforms of Northumberland County, New Brunswick